Catherine the Last (German: Katharina, die Letzte) is a 1936 Austrian romantic comedy film directed by Henry Koster and starring Franciska Gaal, Hans Holt and Hans Olden. It was made by the Austrian subsidiary of Universal Pictures. The film's sets were designed by the art director Erwin Scharf. After making the film Koster moved to Hollywood. In 1938 the film was remade in America as The Girl Downstairs with Gaal reprising her role.

Synopsis
After Hans is frustrated in his attempts to see his girlfriend Sybill by her overprotective business tycoon father, he attempts to gain entry into the house by romancing the family's kitchen maid. While at first he simply uses her as a ruse, he eventually falls in love with her instead.

Cast
 Franciska Gaal as Katharina, Kitchen maid
 Hans Holt as Hans von Gerstikow  
 Hans Olden as Eduard, Hans' friend  
 Otto Wallburg as Sixtus Braun, Big industrialist
 Dorothy Poole as Sybill Braun  
 Eduard Linkers as Steinschneider, Braun's secretary  
 Ernő Verebes as Tobby, Hans' servant  
 Adrienne Gessner as Berta, cook
 Fritz Imhoff as Bubs, car salesman  
 Adolf E. Licho as Excellency
 Georg Schmieter as Fireman
 Sigurd Lohde as Police inspector  
 Comedian Harmonists as Themselves 
 Paul Morgan as Stephan, waiter

References

Bibliography 
 Bock, Hans-Michael & Bergfelder, Tim. The Concise CineGraph. Encyclopedia of German Cinema. Berghahn Books, 2009.

External links 
 

1936 films
Austrian romantic comedy films
Austrian black-and-white films
1936 romantic comedy films
1930s German-language films
Films directed by Henry Koster
Films produced by Joe Pasternak
Films scored by Hans J. Salter